Anders Järryd was the defending champion but did not compete that year.

Miloslav Mečíř won in the final 6–0, 3–6, 6–2, 6–2 against John McEnroe.

Seeds
A champion seed is indicated in bold text while text in italics indicates the round in which that seed was eliminated.

  Boris Becker (withdrew)
  Stefan Edberg (semifinals)
  John McEnroe (final)
  Mats Wilander (quarterfinals)

Draw

References
1987 WCT Finals Draw (Archived 2009-05-08)

Singles